The Catman of Paris is a 1946 American mystery and horror film directed by Lesley Selander and written by Sherman L. Lowe. The film stars Carl Esmond, Lenore Aubert, Adele Mara, Douglass Dumbrille, Gerald Mohr and Fritz Feld.

Plot

The writer Charles Regnier has authored a new book about a human-killing "cat man" who might or might not be a myth. Charles confides in friend Henry Borchard over dinner in Paris that he has made enemies among citizens and even in the government as a result of his controversial work.

A librarian, Devereaux, is found murdered, clawed to death. Devereaux had been in possession of documents that supposedly could destroy Charles's reputation. When his former sweetheart Marguerite Duval is killed in a similar manner, Charles is beaten by townspeople and suspected by police.

Marie Audet, who loves Charles and believes in him, is given a gun by Henry to protect herself. But when she saves herself at night by shooting an intruder, it turns out to be Henry, who with his dying words confesses to the crimes.

Cast

Production

The Catman of Paris went into production on September 20 and finished filming on October 10, 1945. The film was produced in conjunction with Valley of the Zombies with the intent on making it Republic's first horror film double feature.

Release
The Catman of Paris was distributed theatrically by the Republic Pictures Corp. on 20 April 1946.

Reception
From retrospective reviews, Paul Gaita of AllMovie also gave the film a negative review, complimenting the film's action sequences but criticized the film's sluggish plot, lack of atmosphere and suspense; writing "This anemic period potboiler from Poverty Row studio Republic Pictures cribs most of its sluggish plot from the far superior Werewolf of London, but has none of that film's drive, atmosphere, or suspense". 
In Leonard Maltin's Movie Guide, the film was awarded with a one and a half out of a possible four star rating, calling it "talky [and] routine". A review in TV Guide rated the film two out of four stars, commending the film's direction, make-up effects, and performances.

References

External links 
 
 
 

1946 films
1946 horror films
1946 mystery films
1940s serial killer films
1940s mystery horror films
American mystery horror films
American serial killer films
1940s English-language films
Films directed by Lesley Selander
Republic Pictures films
American black-and-white films
Films set in Paris
1940s American films